Ben Lovett (born May 3, 1978) is an American singer, film composer, songwriter and producer. Lovett is the founder of record label, Lovers Label. His non-film compositions are released under the names Lovett and Lovers & Friends.

Previous work includes recording and producing musical projects, Chris Wollard & The Ship Thieves with Chris Wollard (of Hot Water Music), and Heavens with Matt Skiba (of Alkaline Trio).

As a composer, Lovett has scored a diverse range of films and documentaries including Hellraiser, The Ritual and The Night House from director and frequent collaborator David Bruckner, as well as the Jim Cummings' comedy The Wolf of Snow Hollow and Jacob Gentry's Synchronicity, which earned Lovett a nomination for "Discovery Of The Year" at the World Soundtrack Awards in 2016.

Previously he composed scores for Amy Seimetz's award-winning debut Sun Don't Shine and Katie Aselton's thriller "Black Rock" among others.  Lovett has been the recipient of several awards including Best Score at The Brooklyn International Film Festival for The Last Lullaby in 2009, and Best Score for "Ghost of Old Highways" at the Madrid International Film Festival and the Charlotte Film Festival in 2012.

Discography
LPs:

EPs:

Produced Records:

Composer:

References

External links 
 Ben Lovett Website

1978 births
American film score composers
American male film score composers
Living people
Record producers from Georgia (U.S. state)
Songwriters from Georgia (U.S. state)
American male songwriters